TLC may refer to:

Arts and entertainment

Television
 TLC (TV series), a 2002 British situational comedy television series that aired on BBC2
 TLC (TV network), formerly the Learning Channel, an American cable TV network
 TLC (Asia), an Asian television channel
 TLC (Australian TV channel), the Australian and New Zealand TV channel Travel and Living Channel
 TLC (German TV channel), a German television channel
 TLC (India), an Indian television channel
 TLC (Latin America), a television channel broadcasting to several countries in Latin America
 TLC (Middle East and North Africa)
 TLC (Dutch TV channel), a Dutch television channel, which broadcasts lifestyle programs
 TLC (Poland), a Polish television channel
 TLC (Swedish TV channel), a Swedish television channel
 TLC (Turkish TV channel), a Turkish television channel
 TLC (UK and Irish TV channel), a UK and Ireland television channel

Music
 TLC (group), an American R&B/pop group
 TLC (album), 2017 album by American R&B/pop group TLC
"T.L.C.", a song on the album Show Your Hand by the Scottish funk and R&B band Average White Band

Sports
 Tables, Ladders, and Chairs match, a type of professional wrestling match
 WWE TLC: Tables, Ladders & Chairs, a professional wrestling event featuring the above type of match

Organizations
 New York City Taxi and Limousine Commission, a New York City government agency
 Taiwan Lutheran Church, church in Taiwan
 Tasmanian Land Conservancy, Australian non-profit organisation
 The Land Conservancy, a not-for-profit, charitable land trust based in British Columbia, Canada
 The Learning Company, an American educational software company
 SoftKey, a Canadian shovelware company which acquired The Learning Company and used its name from 1995 to 1999
 TLC Camp, American nonprofit providing summer camp for children with cancer
 Trades and Labor Congress of Canada, the primary labor federation in Canada (1883-1956)
 Transitional Learning Center, a post-acute brain injury rehabilitation facility based in Galveston, Texas
 Transgender Law Center, an American civil-rights organization connecting transgender people to legal services
 True and Living Church of Jesus Christ of Saints of the Last Days, an offshoot of The Church of Jesus Christ of Latter-day Saints
 The Literary Consultancy, a UK-based editorial consultancy service

Schools
 Thayer Learning Center, a boot camp for teens in Missouri, US
 The Learning Center for the Deaf, a school for the deaf and hard of hearing in Massachusetts, US
 The Lakes College, a private school in Brisbane, Australia

Science and technology
 Technology life cycle, describes the commercial gain of a product through the expense of research and development phase, and the financial return during its "vital life"
 Thin-layer chromatography, a chromatography technique used in chemistry to separate chemical compounds
 Total lung capacity, refers to the volume of air associated with different phases of the respiratory cycle
 Triple-level cell, a type of flash memory
 Tank Landing Craft, a British WWII landing craft, US called Landing craft tank
 Triple lumen catheter

Other uses
 Toluca International Airport (IATA airport code TLC), Mexico
 Toyota Land Cruiser, an automobile

See also
 
 Tender Loving Care (disambiguation)
 TLS (disambiguation)